The 2009 Victory Bowl was a college football post-season bowl game.  The game was played on November 21, 2009 at Francis Field in Greenville, Illinois. The Geneva College Golden Tornadoes, a provisional member of NCAA D-III Presidents' Athletic Conference played against the Greenville College of NCAA D-III Upper Mid-West Athletic Conference.

Geneva College won their fifth Victory Bowl in its sixth appearance (both NCCAA Victory Bowl records).

Game summary 
Geneva claimed a hard-fought victory over Greenville 29-28, with the issue being decided in the game's final seconds. Greenville took an early lead on a 1-yard touchdown run by Ambers. Gerard Muschette put Geneva on the board with a 5-yard touchdown run during the second quarter to tie the game at 7-7. The Panthers extended their lead on a 39-yard touchdown run by Ambers. The failed extra point gave Greenville a 13-7 lead going into the half.

Ambers scored his third of three touchdowns for Greenville with a 14-yard run. Friedrich caught a two-point conversion attempt from Lira to extend Greenville's lead over Geneva to 21-7. The Golden Tornadoes answered back with Muschette's second touchdown run. The 1 yard run and the extra point cut the Panther's lead to 21-14. Greenville's final points of the game came in the third quarter when Fred scored on a pass of 33 yards from Lira. Ackerman's extra point put the score at 28-14 Greenville. Offensive MVP Gerard Muschette scored his third touchdown of the day late in the 3rd quarter on a five-yard run, but a failed extra point resulted in a scored of 28-20. Senior Matt Barge scored for the Golden Tornadoes with 4:54 left in the 4th quarter to cut the Panther's lead over the Golden Tornadoes to 28-26. A failed two-point conversion attempt by the Golden Tornadoes left Greenville ahead. A successful stand by the Golden Tornado Defense, led by Brian Wilson, gave the ball back to Geneva with 2:12 remaining.

The Drive 

The Golden Tornadoes' final possession of the 2009 season began on their own 3 yard line, with 2:12 remaining in the game. Junior quarterback David Girardi completed a first down pass to Barge for a ten-yard gain. Three incomplete passes resulted in a 4th and 10 for Geneva from their own 13 yard line. Heavy pass rush caused Girardi to scramble from the pocket who then completed a pass to Barge for a gain of 10 and a first down. Another pass to Barge, this time for 14 yards moved the ball out to Geneva's 37 yard line. A short gain on a pass by Girardi to Thurston moved the ball out to Geneva's 41 yard line. The Golden Tornadoes then relied "900 Saint Vincent" for a 47-yard gain down to Greenville's 12 yard line. The play called for Girardi to take a few steps towards Geneva's bench, asking for a new play. The ball was then directly snapped to running back Matt Barge who then lateralled the ball back to Girardi. Girardi then completed a deep post to Nuetzel for a huge gain. Geneva gained 8 more yards on two short passes to Dean and Thurston. A final incomplete pass led to a 4-2 at Greenville's 3 yard line when Nick Dipietro kicked the game-winning field goal with :19 seconds left in the game.

Scoring Summary

Scoring summary

Statistics

Geneva College
 QB David Girardi: 19/35, 248 yds, Int
 RB Gerard Muschette: 20 rush, 113 yds, 3 TD
 WR Sam Thurston: 7 rec, 41 yds
 FB Matt Dean: 4 rec, 52 yds
 RB Matt Barge: 4 rec, 48 yds

Greenville College
 QB Lira: 3/9, 92 yds, TD
 RB Ambers: 26 rush, 126 yds, 3 TD
 WR Fred: 1 rec, 39 yds, TD

References 

Victory Bowl
Victory Bowl
Geneva Golden Tornadoes football bowl games
Greenville Panthers football bowl games
Victory Bowl
Victory Bowl